Ton Llwyd Halt railway station served the village of Aberaman, in the historical county of Glamorganshire, Wales, from 1906 to 1932 on the Vale of Neath Railway.

History 
The station was opened to the public on 1 January 1906, although it opened to miners in 1903. It closed to passengers on 2 January 1922 but remained open for miners until 1932.

References 

Disused railway stations in Rhondda Cynon Taf
Former Great Western Railway stations
Railway stations in Great Britain opened in 1906
Railway stations in Great Britain closed in 1922
1903 establishments in Wales
1932 disestablishments in Wales